Yoxter Cadet Training Camp is a cadet training area and camp owned by the Wessex Reserve Forces' and Cadets' Association and situated on the Mendip Hills in Somerset. It is between the villages of Charterhouse and Priddy. It is adjacent to the Chancellor's Farm biological Site of Special Scientific Interest, and the Somerset Wildlife Trust, Wessex RFCA, Ministry of Defence and Natural England work together to enable conservation grazing on the site.

History

The camp was purchased from non-public funds in 1934 to provide a training facility for the Territorial Army (now known as the Reserves). It was used for Regular Army training in the run-up and during the Second World War, and afterwards the camp reverted to the TA. In 1964 the Royal Anglian Regiment renovated the camp and it has been in use by the Army Cadet Force ever since.

Facilities

The training area has  of land. When firing is not in progress the training area is also used for fieldcraft exercises as well as helicopter training and the driving of non tracked vehicles. The camp has billet accommodation for 100, store rooms, a kitchen, classrooms and toilet facilities. All accommodation was refurbished or rebuilt in 2012/13.

References

Training establishments of the British Army
Organisations based in Somerset
Mendip Hills